is a Japanese footballer currently playing as a defender for Roasso Kumamoto.

Career statistics

Club
.

Notes

References

1998 births
Living people
Association football people from Ishikawa Prefecture
Ritsumeikan University alumni
Japanese footballers
Japan youth international footballers
Association football defenders
J3 League players
J2 League players
Roasso Kumamoto players